Hiệp Hòa is a ward located in Biên Hòa city of Đồng Nai province, Vietnam. It has an area of about 6.9km2 and the population in 2018 was 15,468.

Hiệp Hòa ward is a small island (Vietnamese: Cù Lao) in Đồng Nai river. Its old name was Cù Lao Phố.  Nguyễn Hữu Cảnh Temple located in Hiệp Hòa ward, worships Nguyễn Hữu Cảnh, the General had a huge contribution in the Nam tiến.

References

Bien Hoa